Michael Ostrog (c. 1833 – after 1904) was a Russian criminal and Jack the Ripper suspect, first proposed in a memorandum by Sir Melville Macnaghten in 1894.

Ostrog was a swindler with a profuse police record who perpetrated multiple scams and frauds, but it was never proven that he committed any murders. According to relatively recent investigations, during 1888 he was imprisoned in France, and such a circumstance would rule out his participation in any of the Whitechapel murders.

Criminal biography 
Born in Russia around 1833, little is known about his early years. Ostrog  emigrated to England, becoming known to the authorities in 1863 after committing his initial robbery at the University of Oxford using the alias of Max Grief. On that occasion, he was arrested and sentenced to ten months in jail.

The following year, Ostrog was again imprisoned for three months  for multiple frauds consummated in the city of Cambridge. In December 1864, he was sentenced for eight months, again for fraud. In August 1866, he was jailed for seven years after a series of robberies, mostly stealing gold watches from a jewelry store in Maidstone.

In 1873, Ostrog left prison and soon undertook another succession of thefts. He was arrested and taken to the police station in Burton upon Trent, where he resisted and tried to fire a gun upon the officers. In January 1874, as a result of robberies, contempt and attempted murder, he was sentenced to 10 years imprisonment, and would be released in 1883. Four years later, in July 1887, Ostrog stole the trophy from a cricket contest, and was sentenced to six months in prison.

Freed again in March 1888, prison authorities considered him cured. However, in an article published by Police Gazette, it was argued that he was very dangerous. In September of that year, while in Paris, France, he committed another robbery and was sentenced again. He then left and returned to England. In 1891, he was admitted to an asylum in Surrey.

After this seclusion, Ostrog continued to periodically leave and enter prisons for thefts, scams and frauds until 1904, the year any information about him ceases to be published. It is presumed that he died about this time.

From professional fraudster to alleged serial killer 
Ostrog was a professional scammer who used costumes to improve the chances for a successful scam. He also used a variety of aliases for the same purpose, always seeking to surround himself with an air of mystery, and spread all kinds of lies about his life and activities. One of his most creative hoaxes was to repeatedly claim that he worked as a surgeon in the Russian Navy. However, this was just another of his numerous inventions.

Even though in the memorandum of the Scotland Yard chief, Sir Melville Macnaghten, Ostrog was identified as a Jack the Ripper suspect, the investigators did not find evidence of violent crime in his past, much less homicide. His record of illegal activities only included theft and scams, making him a white collar criminal.

In 2001, Philip Sugden, an expert on the Jack the Ripper case, located police records in which it was stated that Michael Ostrog had been charged with minor crimes and imprisoned in France in 1888, during the period of the Whitechapel murders. Such an alibi erases the misgivings that for a long time fell upon him in 1894, in the "Macnaghten Memorandum", as a likely perpetuator of Jack the Ripper's crimes.

Notes and references

See also 
 Jack the Ripper suspects

External links 
 Biography of Michael Ostrog with some photos of the suspect
 Michael Ostrog (b. 1833, suspect) on the digital site Casebook: Jack the Ripper

1830s births
Year of death unknown
People convicted of fraud
People convicted of theft
Russian fraudsters
People convicted of attempted murder
People convicted of robbery
Jack the Ripper
Russian emigrants to the United Kingdom